Trichilia stellato-tomentosa is a species of plant in the family Meliaceae. It is found in Argentina, Bolivia, Brazil, and Paraguay.

References

stellato-tomentosa
Least concern plants
Flora of Argentina
Flora of Bolivia
Flora of Brazil
Flora of Paraguay
Taxonomy articles created by Polbot